Lissa was a range of HiFi components by Sony, based on the i.LINK S200 interconnect standard and styled in a novel, minimalist design. It was introduced in 2000. Produced as a single series with a unique design.

Although the receiver had some analogue inputs, the components required just a digital i.LINK connection to hook up. The other components only featured a power cord and two i.LINK ports on the rear panel.

The MiniDisc recorder/player & CD player implement the 1394TA specifications:
 AV/C Disc Subunit General Specification
 AV/C Disc Media Type Specification - MD audio
 AV/C Disc Media Type Specification - CD-DA
 AV/C Descriptor Mechanism Specification
 AV/C Information Block Types Specification
These devices can be controlled by either the STR-LSA1 receiver, or through a computer (Windows or Mac) using standard AV/C commands.
The MiniDisc deck appears to be the most complete implementation of the Disc Subunit specification in consumer equipment.

Products 
Only three components and one set of speakers were ever introduced:
 CDP-LSA1 – CD player
 MDS-LSA1 – MiniDisc recorder
 STR-LSA1 – Receiver
 SS-LA500ED – Speakers

for the latest, the speakers were 
a 2.1 system

External links
 

Sony products